North Side station is a Trinity Metro TEXRail commuter rail station in Fort Worth, Texas.

Services

TEXRail
The North Side station was an opening day station when revenue service began on December 31, 2018.  TEXRail connects downtown Fort Worth to Terminal B at DFW International Airport, with numerous stops in between. 

Getting to the Stockyards:

Board at letter A: Southside of the station

The station is connected to the Stockyards via bus routes 12, and 14.  Those busses board at Letter A going toward the stockyards.  

Other Destinations:

Board at letter B: 

14 Eastbound: from the station, the bus heads toward Walmart on Beach @ Airport Freeway and then into downtown.  

12 Eastbound: from the station, the bus heads to Blue Mound Rd, and then to Tanacross and Mercantile Center Station.

Station address: 2829 Decatur Ave. Fort Worth, Tx, 76106

Parking is free for up to 18 hours.

Nearby attractions
Fort Worth Stockyards
Billy Bob's Texas

Gallery

References

External links
 TEXRail

Railway stations in the United States opened in 2019
2019 establishments in Texas
TEXRail stations
Railway stations in Tarrant County, Texas
Railway stations in Fort Worth, Texas